Tim Knipping (born 24 November 1992) is a German professional footballer who plays as a centre back for Dynamo Dresden.

Career
Knipping began his career with KSV Hessen Kassel, and broke into the first team near the end of the 2010–11 season. He joined 1. FC Saarbrücken in July 2012 and made his 3. Liga debut for the club two months later, as a substitute for Sven Sökler in a 2–1 away win over Stuttgarter Kickers. After Saarbrücken were relegated at the end of the 2013–14 season, Knipping moved to Borussia Mönchengladbach II. In 2016, he joined SV Sandhausen. In summer 2019, he moved to SSV Jahn Regensburg. He was disappointed with his playing time in Regensburg and joined Dynamo Dresden who were relegated to the 3. Liga.

References

External links

1992 births
Living people
Association football central defenders
German footballers
KSV Hessen Kassel players
1. FC Saarbrücken players
Borussia Mönchengladbach II players
SSV Jahn Regensburg players
Dynamo Dresden players
2. Bundesliga players
3. Liga players
Regionalliga players